The Heaviside step function, or the unit step function, usually denoted by  or  (but sometimes ,  or ), is a step function, named after Oliver Heaviside (1850–1925), the value of which is zero for negative arguments and one for positive arguments. It is an example of the general class of step functions, all of which can be represented as linear combinations of translations of this one.

The function was originally developed in operational calculus for the solution of differential equations, where it represents a signal that switches on at a specified time and stays switched on indefinitely.

The Heaviside function may be defined as:
 a piecewise function: 
 using the Iverson bracket notation: 
 an indicator function: 
 the derivative of the ramp function: 

The Dirac delta function is the derivative of the Heaviside function 

Hence the Heaviside function can be considered to be the integral of the Dirac delta function. This is sometimes written as

In this context, the Heaviside function is the cumulative distribution function of a random variable which is almost surely 0. (See constant random variable.)

However, the choice may have some important consequences in functional analysis and game theory, where more general forms of continuity are considered. Some common choices can be seen below.

Approximations to the Heaviside step function are of use in biochemistry and neuroscience, where logistic approximations of step functions (such as the Hill and the Michaelis–Menten equations) may be used to approximate binary cellular switches in response to chemical signals.

Analytic approximations 

For a smooth approximation to the step function, one can use the logistic function

If we take , equality holds in the limit:

There are many other smooth, analytic approximations to the step function. Among the possibilities are:

These limits hold pointwise and in the sense of distributions. In general, however, pointwise convergence need not imply distributional convergence, and vice versa distributional convergence need not imply pointwise convergence. (However, if all members of a pointwise convergent sequence of functions are uniformly bounded by some "nice" function, then convergence holds in the sense of distributions too.)

In general, any cumulative distribution function of a continuous probability distribution that is peaked around zero and has a parameter that controls for variance can serve as an approximation, in the limit as the variance approaches zero. For example, all three of the above approximations are cumulative distribution functions of common probability distributions: the logistic, Cauchy and normal distributions, respectively.

Integral representations
Often an integral representation of the Heaviside step function is useful:

where the second representation is easy to deduce from the first, given that the step function is real and thus is its own complex conjugate.

Zero argument 
If using some analytic approximation (as in the examples above) then often whatever happens to be the relevant limit at zero is used.

There exist various reasons for choosing a particular value. 
  is often used since the graph then has rotational symmetry; put another way,  is then an odd function. In this case the following relation with the sign function holds for all : 
  is used when  needs to be right-continuous. For instance cumulative distribution functions are usually taken to be right continuous, as are functions integrated against in Lebesgue–Stieltjes integration. In this case  is the indicator function of a closed semi-infinite interval:  The corresponding probability distribution is the degenerate distribution.
  is used when  needs to be left-continuous. In this case  is an indicator function of an open semi-infinite interval: 
 In functional-analysis contexts from optimization and game theory, it is often useful to define the Heaviside function as a set-valued function to preserve the continuity of the limiting functions and ensure the existence of certain solutions. In these cases, the Heaviside function returns a whole interval of possible solutions, .

Discrete form

An alternative form of the unit step, defined instead as a function  (that is, taking in a discrete variable ), is:

or using the half-maximum convention:

where  is an integer.

The discrete-time unit impulse is the first difference of the discrete-time step

This function is the cumulative summation of the Kronecker delta:

where

is the discrete unit impulse function.

Antiderivative and derivative
The ramp function is an antiderivative of the Heaviside step function: 

The distributional derivative of the Heaviside step function is the Dirac delta function:

Fourier transform 
The Fourier transform of the Heaviside step function is a distribution. Using one choice of constants for the definition of the Fourier transform we have

The limit appearing in the integral is also taken in the sense of (tempered) distributions.

Unilateral Laplace transform 

The Laplace transform of the Heaviside step function is a meromorphic function. Using the unilateral Laplace transform we have:

When the bilateral transform is used, the integral can be split in two parts and the result will be the same.

Other expressions

The Heaviside step function can be represented as a hyperfunction as

See also

 Dirac delta function
 Indicator function
 Iverson bracket
 Laplace transform
 Laplacian of the indicator
 List of mathematical functions
 Macaulay brackets
 Negative number
 Rectangular function
 Sign function
 Sine integral
 Step response

References

External links 

 Digital Library of Mathematical Functions, NIST, .

Special functions
Generalized functions
Schwartz distributions